The Taunus Nature Park (until December 2012 called the High Taunus Nature Park or Naturpark Hochtaunus) is a nature park in Central Germany with an area of 134,775 hectares (1347.75 km2) in the Central Upland range of the Taunus. It is one of two Hessian nature parks in the Taunus and the second largest nature park in Hesse.

Location 
The Taunus Nature Park stretches across the counties of Hochtaunuskreis, Lahn-Dill-Kreis, Limburg-Weilburg, Main-Taunus-Kreis, Wetteraukreis and Gießen. Its boundaries are identical with these counties except that, in the west, it is bounded by the A3 motorway, in the north roughly by the  Lahn valley (but extends between Runkel and Weilburg over the Lahn into the  Westerwald) and in the east by the A5 motorway. In the south it ends where the Main-Taunus Foreland between Frankfurt am Main and Wiesbaden begins. The park borders in the west on the Rhine-Taunus Nature Park.

The nature park covers the eastern half of the natural region of the High Taunus. This is where the main ridge of the Taunus runs with the highest peak in the range, the Großer Feldberg (881.5 m). Also part of the park and north of this ridge is the much larger Eastern Hintertaunus. Another part of the park is the Anterior Taunus, a narrow strip south of the ridge that descends to the Rhine-Main Plain. The original name of the park, "High Taunus", was thus not really accurate.

Fauna 
The High Taunus is sparsely settled and densely covered by coniferous forest. In the Eastern Hintertaunus, deciduous woods dominate. Characteristic of the Taunus with its rolling to high mountain relief are extensive scattered orchards, which occur mainly in the Anterior Taunus and on the eastern slopes facing the Wetterau.

Sights

Various 
 Hessenpark Open-Air Museum – near Neu-Anspach
 Lochmühle Amusement Park – near Wehrheim 
 Saalburg – near Bad Homburg vor der Höhe
 Eschbacher Klippen – near Usingen
 Kubach Crystal Cave – near Kubach
 Lahn Marble – a natural monument near Villmar
 Bad Camberg – historic town centre and Chapel of the Cross
 Braunfels – Braunfels Castle
 Königstein – Königstein Castle
 Falkenstein – ruins of Falkenstein Castle
 Kronberg – Kronberg Castle
 Weilburg – Schloss Weilburg
 Großer Feldberg – at  the highest point of the Taunus, near Schmitten-Oberreifenberg
 Weil Valley – source of the Weil by Kleiner Feldberg Roman Fort
 Opel Zoo – between Königstein and Kronberg
 Vogelburg – castle near Weilrod-Hasselbach 
 Weilburg Wildlife Park – near Weilburg-Hirschhausen

Viewing towers 
There are several observation towers in the nature park on prominent mountains and hills:

(Name, Height in metres (m) above sea level (NHN), Location; Height from  unless otherwise stated; alphabetically sorted)
 Atzelberg (506.7 m), Atzelberg Tower, near Eppenhain
 Gaulskopf (396.8 m), near Wehrheim-Pfaffenwiesbach
 Großer Feldberg (881.5 m), near Schmitten-Oberreifenberg
 Hausberg (485.7 m), near Butzbach-Hausen-Oes
 Hardtberg (408.7 m), near Königstein-Mammolshain
 Herzberg (591.4 m), near Bad Homburg vor der Höhe
 Kapellenberg (292.0 m), mit Meisterturm, bei Hofheim am Taunus
 Pferdskopf (662,6 m), bei Schmitten-Treisberg
 Stoppelberg (401,2 m), bei Wetzlar
 Winterstein (482,3 m), bei Wehrheim-Pfaffenwiesbach

See also 
 List of nature parks in Germany

References

Literature 
 Theodor Arzt, Erich Hentschel, Gertrud Mordhorst: Die Pflanzenwelt des Naturparks Hochtaunus. Institut für Naturschutz Darmstadt, Schriftenreihe Vol. IX, Issue 1, Darmstadt, 1967
 Gudrun Schirrmann: Wanderung im Naturpark Hochtaunus, Stuttgart und Hamburg 1981
 Eugen Ernst: HB Naturmagazin draußen "Naturpark Hochtaunus", Hamburg, 1983
 Zweckverband "Naturpark Hochtaunus": Parkplätze und Rundwanderwege im Naturpark Hochtaunus, Frankfurt, 1988 
 Ingrid Berg, Eugen Ernst, Hans-Joachim Galuschka, Gerta Walsh: Heimat Hochtaunus, Frankfurt am Main, 1988, 
 Alexander Stahr, Birgit Bender: Der Taunus-Eine Zeitreise, Stuttgart, 2007, 
 Stefan Jung: Wandern im Naturpark Hochtaunus, Frankfurt, 2009, 
 Eugen Ernst: Der Taunus - Ein L(i)ebenswertes Mittelgebirge, Frankfurt, 2009,

External links 

 Internet site of the Taunus Nature Park
 Association of German Nature Parks: Facts on Taunus

Taunus
Taunus